In physics and continuum mechanics, deformation is the transformation of a body from a reference configuration to a current configuration.  A configuration is a set containing the positions of all particles of the body.

A  deformation can occur because of external loads, intrinsic activity (e.g. muscle contraction), body forces (such as gravity or electromagnetic forces), or changes in temperature, moisture content, or chemical reactions, etc.

Strain is related to deformation in terms of relative displacement of particles in the body that excludes rigid-body motions.  Different equivalent choices may be made for the expression of a strain field depending on whether it is defined with respect to the initial or the final configuration of the body and on whether the metric tensor or its dual is considered.

In a continuous body, a deformation field results from a stress field due to applied forces or because of some changes in the temperature field of the body. The relation between stress and strain is expressed by constitutive equations, e.g., Hooke's law for linear elastic materials. Deformations which cease to exist after the stress field is removed are termed as elastic deformation. In this case, the continuum completely recovers its original configuration. On the other hand, irreversible deformations remain. They exist even after stresses have been removed. One type of irreversible deformation is plastic deformation, which occurs in material bodies after stresses have attained a certain threshold value known as the elastic limit or yield stress, and are the result of slip, or dislocation mechanisms at the atomic level. Another type of irreversible deformation is viscous deformation, which is the irreversible part of viscoelastic deformation.

In the case of elastic deformations, the response function linking strain to the deforming stress is the compliance tensor of the material.

Strain

Strain represents the displacement between particles in the body relative to a reference length.

Deformation of a body is expressed in the form  where  is the reference position of material points of the body.  Such a measure does not distinguish between rigid body motions (translations and rotations) and changes in shape (and size) of the body.  A deformation has units of length.

We could, for example, define strain to be

where  is the identity tensor.
Hence strains are dimensionless and are usually expressed as a decimal fraction, a percentage or in parts-per notation. Strains measure how much a given deformation differs locally from a rigid-body deformation.

A strain is in general a tensor quantity.  Physical insight into strains can be gained by observing that a given strain can be decomposed into normal and shear components.  The amount of stretch or compression along material line elements or fibers is the normal strain, and the amount of distortion associated with the sliding of plane layers over each other is the shear strain, within a deforming body. This could be applied by elongation, shortening, or volume changes, or angular distortion.

The state of strain at a material point of a continuum body is defined as the totality of all the changes in length of material lines or fibers, the normal strain, which pass through that point and also the totality of all the changes in the angle between pairs of lines initially perpendicular to each other, the shear strain, radiating from this point. However, it is sufficient to know the normal and shear components of strain on a set of three mutually perpendicular directions.

If there is an increase in length of the material line, the normal strain is called tensile strain, otherwise, if there is reduction or compression in the length of the material line, it is called compressive strain.

Strain measures
Depending on the amount of strain, or local deformation, the analysis of deformation is subdivided into three deformation theories:
 Finite strain theory, also called large strain theory, large deformation theory, deals with deformations in which both rotations and strains are arbitrarily large. In this case, the undeformed and deformed configurations of the continuum are significantly different and a clear distinction has to be made between them. This is commonly the case with elastomers, plastically-deforming materials and other fluids and biological soft tissue.
 Infinitesimal strain theory, also called small strain theory, small deformation theory, small displacement theory, or small displacement-gradient theory where strains and rotations are both small. In this case, the undeformed and deformed configurations of the body can be assumed identical. The infinitesimal strain theory is used in the analysis of deformations of materials exhibiting elastic behavior, such as materials found in mechanical and civil engineering applications, e.g. concrete and steel.
 Large-displacement or large-rotation theory, which assumes small strains but large rotations and displacements.

In each of these theories the strain is then defined differently. The engineering strain is the most common definition applied to materials used in mechanical and structural engineering, which are subjected to very small deformations. On the other hand, for some materials, e.g., elastomers and polymers, subjected to large deformations, the engineering definition of strain is not applicable, e.g. typical engineering strains greater than 1%, thus other more complex definitions of strain are required, such as stretch, logarithmic strain, Green strain, and Almansi strain.

Engineering strain
Engineering strain, also known as Cauchy strain, is expressed as the ratio of total deformation to the initial dimension of the material body on which forces are applied. The normal strain is positive if the material fibers are stretched and negative if they are compressed. Thus, we have

Measures of strain are often expressed in parts per million or microstrains.

The true shear strain is defined as the change in the angle (in radians) between two material line elements initially perpendicular to each other in the undeformed or initial configuration. The engineering shear strain is defined as the tangent of that angle, and is equal to the length of deformation at its maximum divided by the perpendicular length in the plane of force application which sometimes makes it easier to calculate.

Stretch ratio
The stretch ratio or extension ratio is a measure of the extensional or normal strain of a differential line element, which can be defined at either the undeformed configuration or the deformed configuration. It is defined as the ratio between the final length  and the initial length  of the material line.

The extension ratio is approximately related to the engineering strain by

This equation implies that the normal strain is zero, so that there is no deformation when the stretch is equal to unity.

The stretch ratio is used in the analysis of materials that exhibit large deformations, such as elastomers, which can sustain stretch ratios of 3 or 4 before they fail. On the other hand, traditional engineering materials, such as concrete or steel, fail at much lower stretch ratios.

True strain
The logarithmic strain , also called, true strain or Hencky strain. Considering an incremental strain (Ludwik)

the logarithmic strain is obtained by integrating this incremental strain:

where  is the engineering strain. The logarithmic strain provides the correct measure of the final strain when deformation takes place in a series of increments, taking into account the influence of the strain path.

Green strain

The Green strain is defined as:

Almansi strain

The Euler-Almansi strain is defined as

Normal and shear strain

Strains are classified as either normal or shear. A normal strain is perpendicular to the face of an element, and a shear strain is parallel to it. These definitions are consistent with those of normal stress and shear stress.

Normal strain
For an isotropic material that obeys Hooke's law, a normal stress will cause a normal strain. Normal strains produce dilations.

Consider a two-dimensional, infinitesimal, rectangular material element with dimensions , which, after deformation, takes the form of a rhombus. The deformation is described by the displacement field . From the geometry of the adjacent figure we have

and

The normal strain in the -direction of the rectangular element is defined by

Similarly, the normal strain in the - and -directions becomes

Shear strain

Therefore,

From the geometry of the figure, we have

For small displacement gradients we have

Therefore,

thus

Similarly, for the - and -planes, we have

The tensorial shear strain components of the infinitesimal strain tensor can then be expressed using the engineering strain definition, as

Metric tensor

A strain field associated with a displacement is defined, at any point, by the change in length of the tangent vectors representing the speeds of arbitrarily parametrized curves passing through that point.  A basic geometric result, due to Fréchet, von Neumann and Jordan, states that, if the lengths of the tangent vectors fulfil the axioms of a norm and the parallelogram law, then the length of a vector is the square root of the value of the quadratic form associated, by the polarization formula, with a positive definite bilinear map called the metric tensor.

Description of deformation
Deformation is the change in the metric properties of a continuous body, meaning that a curve drawn in the initial body placement changes its length when displaced to a curve in the final placement. If none of the curves changes length, it is said that a rigid body displacement occurred.

It is convenient to identify a reference configuration or initial geometric state of the continuum body which all subsequent configurations are referenced from. The reference configuration need not be one the body actually will ever occupy. The configuration at the current time  is the current configuration.

For deformation analysis, the reference configuration is identified as undeformed configuration, and the current configuration as deformed configuration. Additionally, time is not considered when analyzing deformation, thus the sequence of configurations between the undeformed and deformed configurations are of no interest.

The components  of the position vector  of a particle in the reference configuration, taken with respect to the reference coordinate system, are called the material or reference coordinates. On the other hand, the components  of the position vector  of a particle in the deformed configuration, taken with respect to the spatial coordinate system of reference, are called the spatial coordinates

There are two methods for analysing the deformation of a continuum. One description is made in terms of the material or referential coordinates, called material description or Lagrangian description. A second description of deformation is made in terms of the spatial coordinates it is called the spatial description or Eulerian description.

There is continuity during deformation of a continuum body in the sense that:
 The material points forming a closed curve at any instant will always form a closed curve at any subsequent time.
 The material points forming a closed surface at any instant will always form a closed surface at any subsequent time and the matter within the closed surface will always remain within.

Affine deformation
A deformation is called an affine deformation if it can be described by an affine transformation.  Such a transformation is composed of a linear transformation (such as rotation, shear, extension and compression) and a rigid body translation.  Affine deformations are also called homogeneous deformations.

Therefore, an affine deformation has the form

In matrix form, where the components are with respect to an orthonormal basis,

Rigid body motion
A rigid body motion is a special affine deformation that does not involve any shear, extension or compression.  The transformation matrix  is proper orthogonal in order to allow rotations but no reflections.

A rigid body motion can be described by

where

In matrix form,

Displacement

A change in the configuration of a continuum body results in a displacement. The displacement of a body has two components: a rigid-body displacement and a deformation. A rigid-body displacement consists of a simultaneous translation and rotation of the body without changing its shape or size. Deformation implies the change in shape and/or size of the body from an initial or undeformed configuration  to a current or deformed configuration  (Figure 1).

If after a displacement of the continuum there is a relative displacement between particles, a deformation has occurred. On the other hand, if after displacement of the continuum the relative displacement between particles in the current configuration is zero, then there is no deformation and a rigid-body displacement is said to have occurred.

A displacement field is a vector field of all displacement vectors for all particles in the body, which relates the deformed configuration with the undeformed configuration. It is convenient to do the analysis of deformation or motion of a continuum body in terms of the displacement field. In general, the displacement field is expressed in terms of the material coordinates as

or in terms of the spatial coordinates as

Thus

Knowing that

then

Thus, we have

or in terms of the spatial coordinates as

Displacement gradient tensor
The partial differentiation of the displacement vector with respect to the material coordinates yields the material displacement gradient tensor . Thus we have:

or

where  is the deformation gradient tensor.

Similarly, the partial differentiation of the displacement vector with respect to the spatial coordinates yields the spatial displacement gradient tensor . Thus we have,

or

Examples of deformations
Homogeneous (or affine) deformations are useful in elucidating the behavior of materials.  Some homogeneous deformations of interest are
 uniform extension
 pure dilation
 equibiaxial tension
 simple shear
 pure shear
Plane deformations are also of interest, particularly in the experimental context.

Plane deformation
A plane deformation, also called plane strain, is one where the deformation is restricted to one of the planes in the reference configuration.

In matrix form,

From the polar decomposition theorem, the deformation gradient, up to a change of coordinates, can be decomposed into a stretch and a rotation.  Since all the deformation is in a plane, we can write

Isochoric plane deformation
If the deformation is isochoric (volume preserving) then  and we have 
Alternatively,

Simple shear
A simple shear deformation is defined as an isochoric plane deformation in which there is a set of line elements with a given reference orientation that do not change length and orientation during the deformation.

Therefore,

Since the deformation is isochoric,

Define 
Then, the deformation gradient in simple shear can be expressed as

Now,

Since

we can also write the deformation gradient as

See also
 The deformation of long elements such as beams or studs due to bending forces is known as deflection.
 Euler–Bernoulli beam theory
 Deformation (engineering)
 Finite strain theory
 Infinitesimal strain theory
 Moiré pattern
 Shear modulus
 Shear stress
 Shear strength
 Stress (mechanics)
 Stress measures

References

Further reading
 
 
 
 
 
 
 
 
 
 

Tensors
Continuum mechanics
Non-Newtonian fluids
Solid mechanics